Patrick Joseph Naughton (born April 16, 1996) is an American professional baseball pitcher for the St. Louis Cardinals of Major League Baseball (MLB). He has previously played in MLB for the Los Angeles Angels.

Amateur career
Naughton attended Boston Latin School in Boston, Massachusetts, graduating in 2014. He underwent Tommy John surgery his junior year. He was not drafted out of high school in the 2014 Major League Baseball draft and thus enrolled at Virginia Tech where he played college baseball.

In 2015, Naughton's freshman year at Virginia Tech, he pitched 44 innings, going 2–1 with a 4.91 ERA and 35 strikeouts. As a sophomore in 2016, he appeared in 15 games (making 14 starts) in which he compiled a 3–7 record and a 6.75 ERA. That summer, he played in the Cape Cod Baseball League for the Harwich Mariners and was named a league all-star. In 2017, as a junior at Virginia Tech, he pitched in 17 games (seven starts) in which he went 2–6 with a 6.24 ERA, striking out 63 batters in  innings. After his junior year, he was selected by the Cincinnati Reds in the ninth round of the 2017 Major League Baseball draft.

Professional career

Cincinnati Reds organization
Naughton signed with the Reds and made his professional debut with the Billings Mustangs of the Rookie Advanced Pioneer League. Over 14 games (12 starts), he went 3–3 with a 3.15 ERA, striking out 63 batters in 60 innings and earning All-Star honors. In 2018, he played with the Dayton Dragons of the Class A Midwest League, pitching to a 5–10 record and 4.03 ERA over 28 starts. He began 2019 with the Daytona Tortugas of the Class A-Advanced Florida State League, with whom he was named an All-Star, before being promoted to the Chattanooga Lookouts of the Class AA Southern League in May, finishing the season there. Over 28 starts between the two clubs, Naughton pitched to an 11–12 record with a 3.32 ERA, striking out 131 over 157 innings.

Los Angeles Angels
 
On August 31, 2020, the Reds traded Naughton and Jose Salvador to the Los Angeles Angels for Brian Goodwin. He did not play a minor league game in 2020 due to the cancellation of the minor league season caused by the COVID-19 pandemic. To begin the 2021 season, Naughton was assigned to the Rocket City Trash Pandas of the Double-A South. After one start, he was promoted to the Salt Lake Bees of the Triple-A West.

On August 4, 2021, the Angels selected Naughton's contract and promoted him to the major leagues. At the time of his promotion, he had a 5.34 ERA over  innings pitched between Rocket City and Salt Lake. On August 8, he made his major league debut in relief at Dodger Stadium against the Los Angeles Dodgers, giving up one run, one hit, and two walks over one inning. On September 1, 2021, against the New York Yankees, Naughton made his first career start, pitching  innings, allowing three runs and striking out two. Naughton finished the 2021 season with the Angels appearing in seven games (five starts) in which he went 0–4 with a 6.35 ERA, 14 walks, and 12 strikeouts over  innings.

On March 18, 2022, Naughton was designated for assignment by the Angels.

St. Louis Cardinals
On March 21, 2022, Naughton was claimed off waivers by the St. Louis Cardinals and joined the club's 40-man roster. He was assigned to the Memphis Redbirds of the Triple-A International League to begin the 2022 season. Naughton made his debut with the big league club on April 26, 2022, and pitched  scoreless innings against the New York Mets in a 0–3 loss.

References

External links

1996 births
Living people
Baseball players from Boston
Major League Baseball pitchers
Los Angeles Angels players
St. Louis Cardinals players
Virginia Tech Hokies baseball players
Harwich Mariners players
Billings Mustangs players
Dayton Dragons players
Daytona Tortugas players
Chattanooga Lookouts players
Rocket City Trash Pandas players
Salt Lake Bees players